Musayed Al-Azimi (born 9 August 1969) is a Kuwaiti sprinter. He competed in the men's 4 × 400 metres relay at the 2000 Summer Olympics.

References

External links
 

1969 births
Living people
Athletes (track and field) at the 2000 Summer Olympics
Kuwaiti male sprinters
Olympic athletes of Kuwait
Place of birth missing (living people)
Athletes (track and field) at the 1998 Asian Games
Asian Games competitors for Kuwait
20th-century Kuwaiti people
21st-century Kuwaiti people